Louis Charles Marie Dutfoy (12 January 1860 in Marseille – 7 August 1904 in Marseille) was a French sport shooter who competed in the late 19th century and early 20th century. He participated in Shooting at the 1900 Summer Olympics in Paris and won a silver medal with the French military pistol team.

References

External links
 

French male sport shooters
Olympic silver medalists for France
Olympic shooters of France
Shooters at the 1900 Summer Olympics
1860 births
1904 deaths
Olympic medalists in shooting
Medalists at the 1900 Summer Olympics
Sportspeople from Marseille